State Route 182 (abbreviated SR 182) is a secondary state highway in western Dyer County, Tennessee, United States.  This route is primarily rural in nature throughout its length.

Route description
The first  of SR 182 from its southern terminus with SR 104 to Interstate 155 is a modern two-lane facility with a  speed limit. I-155 ended at Exit 7 during the 1970s and this section of SR 182 also served as a temporary link to SR 104 for eastbound motorists until the freeway was completed to Exit 15. SR 182 north of I-155 to its northern terminus with SR 78 is quite circuitous as the highway winds its way up the Chickasaw Bluff. This section of SR 182 has numerous hills and curves and features narrow roadway width and reduced speed limits. SR 182 is signed as a south–north route, however, the highway actually follows a west–east direction from Lenox to SR 78.

Major intersections

See also

 List of state routes in Tennessee
 List of highways numbered 182

References

External links

182
Transportation in Dyer County, Tennessee